St. Vith is a city and municipality of East Belgium located in the Walloon province of Liège. It was named after Saint Vitus.

On January 1, 2006, St. Vith had a total population of 9,169. The total area is 146.93 km², giving a population density of 62 inhabitants per km². The official language of the municipality is German.

The municipality consists of the following sub-municipalities: Sankt Vith, Crombach, Lommersweiler, Recht, and Schönberg.

History
St. Vith was an important marketplace of the region by the 12th century and received town rights in 1350. The town was damaged by fires in 1543, 1602, and 1689. It was part of the Duchy of Luxemburg then of France until the defeat of French Emperor Napoleon Bonaparte. As a result of the Congress of Vienna it was given to the Kingdom of Prussia.

St. Vith was transferred to Belgium on March 6, 1925, by the Treaty of Versailles after the defeat of the German Empire in World War I.

An important road and railway junction, St. Vith was fought over in the 1944 Battle of the Bulge during World War II. The United States Army defended the town against German assault for a few days, delaying the German attack plan, before eventually being forced to retreat. Once it was captured by German forces, the town was bombed by the US Army Air Forces on 25 and 26 December 1944 and by RAF Bomber Command with 300 aircraft on the 26.  St. Vith was mostly destroyed during the ground battle and subsequent air attack. American forces retook the town on January 23, 1945. The only pre-war architecture remaining is the Büchel Tower.

St. Vith is the setting for Michael Oren's novel, Reunion, concerning a fictional reunion of an American battalion which participated in the Battle of the Bulge.

Sister cities
 Kerpen, North Rhine-Westphalia, 
 Teiuș, Alba County,

See also
 List of protected heritage sites in Sankt-Vith

References

Further reading

External links
 
Official website

 
Cities in Wallonia